Philippus may refer to:

 Philippus (cognomen), a name associated with the Roman gens Marcia
 Philippus (character), a fictional character in DC Comics

People 
 Flavius Philippus, a Roman Empire official under Emperor Constantius II c. 350
 Nonius Philippus ( 242), governor of Britannia Inferior
 Philippus (son of Philip V), half-brother of Perseus Antigonid King of Macedon
 Philippus of Chollidae, Plato's neighbor
 Philippus Baldaeus (1632–1672), Dutch minister
 Philippus Jacobus Brepols (1778–1845), Belgian printer and businessman
 Philippus Brietius (1601–1668), French Jesuit historian and cartographer
 Philippus Innemee (1902–1963), Dutch cyclist at the 1924 Summer Olympics
 Philippus Aureolus Paracelsus (1493/4–1541), Swiss physician, alchemist and astrologer of the German Renaissance
 Philippus Rovenius (1573–1651), apostolic vicar of the Dutch Mission
 Philippus Vethaak (1914–1991), Dutch cyclist at the 1936 Summer Olympics

See also 
 Philipus Biguerny or Felipe Vigarny (c.1475–1542), French architect and sculptor of the Spanish Renaissance
 Philipus Freylinck (1886–1908), South African cyclist at the 1908 Summer Olympics
 Lucius Marcius Philippus (disambiguation)
 Quintus Marcius Philippus (disambiguation)
 Philip (disambiguation)